On February 21–23, 1998, a devastating tornado outbreak affected portions of the Southeastern United States, primarily the U.S. state of Florida. Sometimes known as the Night of the Tornadoes, it was the deadliest tornado event in Florida history. Affecting mainly the Interstate 4 (I-4) corridor of Central Florida, including the Greater Orlando area, the tornadoes—among the strongest ever recorded in Florida—produced near-violent damage, killed 42 people, and caused 259 injuries.

One of the tornadoes was initially rated an F4 on the Fujita scale—among only two others officially so designated in the State of Florida, in 1958 and 1966—but was subsequently downgraded to a high-end F3; with 25 fatalities, most of which occurred in and near Kissimmee, this tornado featured the deadliest single-tornado death toll in Florida history, the previous such record being 17 on March 31, 1962. Two other F3s and a couple of additional strong tornadoes occurred over portions of Central Florida during the outbreak, killing an additional 17 people and injuring 109 others.

As the most intense activity of the outbreak occurred after sunset, concentrated either shortly prior to or after midnight, and affected densely populated portions of the I-4 corridor, including numerous mobile home and recreational vehicle (RV) parks, many sleeping residents became casualties; of the 42 deaths, 40 occurred in manufactured housing or trailers, including 15 at the Morningside Acres mobile home park and eight at the Ponderosa RV Park, both of which were located in Kissimmee.

Background
On February 22, 1998, data from both NEXRAD and weather satellites indicated that a bow echo and associated outflow boundary bisected portions of the Florida Panhandle and northernmost peninsular Florida, including the First Coast. Along the boundary, a vigorous squall line with embedded supercells—the initial nexus of severe weather—developed over the eastern Gulf of Mexico and headed eastward, toward the Tampa Bay Area. Ahead of the squall line, a retreating warm front coincided with robust atmospheric instability due to diurnal heating. By 7:00 p.m. This upper-level jet streak intersected a strengthening low-level wind field, with winds locally in excess of  just above the surface, and thereby yielded conducive conditions to tornadogenesis.

During the evening and the overnight hours of February 22–23, 1998, this volatile environment—known to be common in the El Niño phase of the El Niño–Southern Oscillation (ENSO) during the Florida dry season (November 1 – April 30)—eventually produced seven tornadoes between about 11:00 p.m. EST on February 22 and 2:30 am. EST on the following morning. During El Niño the jet stream is typically stronger and displaced southward near or over Florida during meteorological winter and spring, thereby augmenting the likelihood of significant severe weather and tornado activity. During February 1998 one of the strongest El Niño episodes on record was ongoing, rivaling a similar episode in 1982–3 that had also contributed to elevated tornado activity over Florida. By October 1997, the National Weather Service (NWS) in Melbourne, Florida, highlighted the potential for enhanced severe weather over the coming months due to El Niño.

By 6:00 am. EST (11:00 UTC) on February 22, the Storm Prediction Center (SPC) had issued a convective outlook for day one indicating a moderate risk of severe thunderstorms capable of producing tornadoes over portions of North and Central Florida. At 11:55 am. EST (16:55 UTC), the NWS in Melbourne also issued a Hazardous Weather Outlook (HWO) highlighting a "significant" threat of tornadoes, hail, and destructive winds. By 1:44 pm. EST (18:44 UTC), the SPC issued its first tornado watch covering portions of the threatened area in Central Florida. Numerous, long-lived supercells with persistent mesocyclones would eventually evolve during the evening and track generally east-northeastward or northeastward over Central Florida, generating tornadoes that killed 42 people and seriously injured at least 259 others, making the outbreak the deadliest in Florida's history, surpassing another that killed 17 people on March 31, 1962, in Santa Rosa County.

Outbreak statistics

Confirmed tornadoes

February 21 event

February 22 event

February 23 event

Intercession City–Campbell–Poinciana–Kissimmee–Buenaventura Lakes–Lake Hart–Lake Mary Jane, Florida

This devastating, long-tracked tornado was initially assigned an F4 rating, but NWS assessments later reduced this to high-end F3 intensity. It first did some minor damage to homes in the Campbell–Poinciana area. As it moved into Kissimmee, it leveled part of The Shops at Kissimmee shopping center and crossed the northern part of Lake Tohopekaliga.

The tornado subsequently crossed U.S. Route 441 and reached its maximum intensity as it struck the Ponderosa Pines RV park. In the RV park, at least 10 people died and almost all of the 200 residences, including both RVs and mobile homes, were destroyed. Many of these residences had their frames thrown, stripped, and wrapped around trees. Many trees were snapped and uprooted as well. Nearby, the Morningside Acres mobile home park was devastated as well. Upon leaving the Ponderosa Pines and Morningside areas, the tornado heavily damaged homes next to a school in the Lakeside Estates subdivision of Buenaventura Lakes.

After devastating the Kissimmee area, the tornado mostly impacted rural, swampy areas in Orange and Brevard counties, though it hit a few lakeside homes in Lake Hart and Lake Mary Jane. Along the entire path, 1,000 structures were damaged or destroyed, including several well-built homes that were nearly leveled. At least one new home, built of stucco and CBUs, was flattened except for its front entryway and part of a wall.

See also
List of North American tornadoes and tornado outbreaks
2007 Groundhog Day tornado outbreak

Notes

References

Sources

K
K
K
Kissimmee Tornado Outbreak, 1998
Kissimmee
K
Kissimmee tornado outbreak